Alov is a Russian masculine surname, its feminine counterpart is Alova. Notable people with the surname include:

Aleksandr Alov (1923–1983), Russian film director and screenwriter
Arkadi Alov (1914–1982), Russian football player

Russian-language surnames